Alexandre Arcady (born 17 March 1947) is a French actor, film director, producer and screenwriter.

Life and career
Alexandre Arcady was born in Algiers, Algeria. He emigrated to France at the age of fifteen. His son is filmmaker Alexandre Aja.

He has expressed his surprise at the "lack of leadership" of Israel during the Arab Spring, and he called Israel "the most advanced democracy in the Middle East".

Filmography

As an actor
To Be Twenty in the Aures (1972)
César and Rosalie (1972)
Arrête ton cinéma (2016)

As a director
 (1979)
 (1982)
 (1983)
Hold-Up (1985)
Last Summer in Tangiers (1987)
 (1989)
Pour Sacha (1991)
Day of Atonement (Le Grand Pardon II) (1992)
Dis-moi oui... (1995)
 (1997)
Return to Algiers (2000)
 (2002)
 (2004)
Tu peux garder un secret? (2008)
 (2010)
What the Day Owes the Night (2012)
24 Days (2014)

As a producer
Last Summer in Tangiers (1987)
L'union sacrée (1989)
C'est la vie (1990)
Le Grand Pardon II (1992)
À la folie (1994)
Dis-moi oui... (1995)
Furia (1999)
Return to Algiers (2000)
Break of Dawn (2002)
High Tension (2003)
Mariage mixte (2004)
L'anniversaire (2005)
Tu peux garder un secret? (2008)
Comme les cinq doigts de la main (2010)
Ce que le jour doit à la nuit (2012)
24 Days (2014)
Arrête ton cinéma (2016)

References

 Alexandre Arcady @ ECI Global Talent Management

External links
 

1947 births
Living people
Jewish French male actors
French male film actors
French film directors
French film producers
French male screenwriters
French screenwriters
People from Algiers
Algerian Jews
French people of Algerian-Jewish descent
Pieds-Noirs